Bistritsa (also transcribed as Bistritza or Bistrica) is a large village in the Pancharevo municipality, located at 15 km to the south of the capital Sofia.  it has 5,118 inhabitants.

Bistritsa is among the oldest villages in the areas around Vitosha. Its name was marked in maps of the Second Bulgarian Empire as a fortress. There is a Medieval monastery which was destroyed by the Ottoman army in 1393–1396. Between 1936 and 1946 the church of the monastery was rebuilt. During these works a Medieval grave has been excavated. It had been robbed and the only discovery was a copper coin from Emperor Ivan Shishman (1371-1395).

There is a chitalishte in Bistritsa, named "St. Tsar Boris" from 1909.

Bistritsa is home to the famous "Bistritsa Grannies" a folklore ensemble consisting of elderly women, their daughters and granddaughters, who have been classified as "living treasures" by UNESCO.

Villages in Sofia City Province